"4th of July" is a single release by Scottish recording artist Amy Macdonald, it was released as the third single from her third studio album, Life in a Beautiful Light, on 22 October 2012. The song was written by Amy Macdonald and produced by Pete Wilkinson.

Background
The song was inspired by a childhood trip to New York with her family on Independence Day.

Music video

Background
On 2 October 2012 Macdonald announced that she was filming the video saying, "Early start today. Filming the video for '4th of July'". On 17 October 2012 she wrote, "The video for 4th of July is nearly finished and ready to go! I am really happy with it! Excited for you all to see it!". On 18 October 2012 Mercury Music Group announced the release date of the single, "@Amy__Macdonald single for ‘4th Of July’ is out next week! Video coming soon.." The music video was uploaded to YouTube on 24 October 2012 at a total length of four minutes.

Live performances
On 26 October 2012 Macdonald performed the song live on This Morning.
On the Under stars tour, Macdonald performed an acoustic version of the song with a very different arrangement.

Track listing

Release history

References

External links
 Amy Macdonald - Amy Macdonald official site

2012 singles
Amy Macdonald songs
Songs written by Amy Macdonald
2012 songs
Mercury Records singles
Holiday songs